Murphy Jensen (born October 30, 1968) is an American former professional tennis player and Grand Slam doubles champion.  He is the younger brother of former professional tennis player Luke Jensen, with whom he teamed to win the 1993 French Open Doubles title.

He is the co-founder of WEconnect, a healthcare information technology company with a platform designed to aid addiction recovery, and currently the head coach of the Washington Kastles of World TeamTennis.

Early life 
Murphy Jensen grew up on a Christmas-tree farm in the summer resort town of Ludington in western Michigan. He is of Danish descent He first saw a tennis net being used to corral salmon along the Pere Marquette River as a boy. His father (who tried out with the New York Giants as an offensive guard and then became a high school tennis coach) Howard Jensen, taught Murphy and brother Luke to play tennis before they were 5 years old.

Collegiate tennis career
Jensen and his brother Luke both attended the University of Southern California in Los Angeles, California. After two years playing for the USC Trojans, Murphy transferred to the University of Georgia for one year and then turned professional to pursue a career in tennis and to join his brother Luke on the ATP Tour.

Business ownership and activism 
After winning the 1993 French Open with Luke, the Jensen brothers became a center-court attraction. Murphy turned to drugs and alcohol to cope with the stress of his new-found success and celebrity status. In 1995, he missed a mixed-doubles match at Wimbledon with Brenda Schultz-McCarthy and his family feared he had been kidnapped.

After losing in the first round of the 1999 US Open, feeling the pressure of work and family responsibilities (his son, William, was born a few weeks after the tournament), Jensen found himself in the throes of addiction. A hotel manager noticed Jensen's apparent crisis and contacted an interventionist, who asked Jensen to consider treatment for addiction recovery. Jensen agreed, and has since been in recovery from alcohol and drug addiction.

In 2014, Jensen met serial entrepreneur Daniella Tudor, also in treatment for addiction recovery. After leaving recovery, the two worked together towards improving addiction recovery awareness. In 2016, Jensen, Tudor, and business owner Jen Mallory co-founded WEconnect, a web application platform designed to assist patients with addiction recovery after treatment. Described as a "social-purpose corporation", WEconnect's business platform is centered around providing "accountability for an individual's recovery activities by closing the gap in communication with their support network." In June 2016, WEconnect won the TechCrunch Seattle Meet-Up, and was then chosen as the wildcard battlefield startup at TechCrunch Disrupt San Francisco in September later that year.

Personal life
Jensen has a son William (born 1999) with actress Robin Givens, whom he dated periodically during the late 1990s.

Jensen has been open about his addiction and the factors that led to his recovery. He has been in long-term recovery and sober since June 1, 2006, and he cites his close relationships with recovery mentors as one of the key factors in preventing relapse.

ATP career finals

Doubles: 11 (4 titles, 7 runner-ups)

ATP Challenger and ITF Futures finals

Doubles: 5 (3–2)

Performance timelines

Doubles

Mixed doubles

Film and television career 
Since retiring from the game, Jensen has acted in bit parts in films such as Wimbledon and more recently Tennis, Anyone. He currently hosts several programs on the Tennis Channel, including Open Access and Murphy's Guide.

On Open Access Jensen reports on high-profile tennis events around the world and interviews participating players about their lives and careers.

Each episode of the more comedic Murphy's Guide is a guide for tourists to a particular city where a major tennis tournament is taking place, such as Paris, London, New York, Melbourne etc. At least one major player appears at some point in the episode, and there is usually a brief segment about where enthusiasts of the game can play when in town, but the show's content mainly features Jensen attempting to navigate the city's sights, trying exotic food, and interacting with locals in his unique style. Through his experiences and misadventures, however, specific travel information about local hotels, restaurants, and attractions is conveyed, often with the help of animated maps and graphics. Many episodes also feature a scripted opening sequence, such as Jensen being made to walk the plank by the pirates of Treasure Island in Las Vegas, being psychoanalyzed by Sigmund Freud in Vienna, and impersonating James Bond and Crocodile Dundee in London and Melbourne, respectively.

References

External links
 Official website.
 
 
 

1968 births
Living people
American male film actors
American male tennis players
American male television actors
French Open champions
Tennis players from Atlanta
People from Hollywood, Los Angeles
People from Ludington, Michigan
Tennis people from Georgia (U.S. state)
Tennis people from Michigan
USC Trojans men's tennis players
Grand Slam (tennis) champions in men's doubles